Javiera Paz Toro Ibarra (born 22 April 1998) is a Chilean professional footballer who plays as a defender for Spanish Primera División club UDG Tenerife and the Chile women's national team.

Career 
In July 2022, she moved to UDG Tenerife from Sevilla.

References 

1998 births
Living people
People from Tocopilla
Chilean women's footballers
Chilean expatriate women's footballers
Chile women's international footballers
Women's association football defenders
Club Deportivo Palestino (women) players
Santiago Morning (women) footballers
Colo-Colo (women) footballers
Sevilla FC (women) players
UD Granadilla Tenerife players
Primera División (women) players
2019 FIFA Women's World Cup players
Footballers at the 2020 Summer Olympics
Olympic footballers of Chile
Chilean expatriate sportspeople in Spain
Expatriate women's footballers in Spain